Tom Carson (born c. 1852) was a Scottish professional golfer who played in the late 19th century. Carson tied for seventh place in the 1875 Open Championship.

Early life
Carson was born in Scotland circa 1852.

Golf career

1875 Open Championship
The 1875 Open Championship was the 15th Open Championship, held 10 September at Prestwick Golf Club in Prestwick, South Ayrshire, Scotland. Willie Park, Sr. won the Championship by two strokes from runner-up Bob Martin. Willie Park, who had won the first Championship in 1860, equalled Tom Morris, Jr.'s record of four Championship wins. Carson's total was 181 and he tied for seventh place with Bob Pringle. They each won £1 in prize money.

Death
Carson's date of death is unknown.

References

Scottish male golfers
1850s births
Year of death missing